Charles Gilbert Gates (May 26, 1876 – October 29, 1913) of Minneapolis, Minnesota was the owner of the first home in the United States where air conditioning was installed in 1914. He was the son of John Warne Gates, also known as "Bet-a-Million" Gates.

Biography
Charles Gilbert Gates was the son of John Warne Gates, a manufacturer of barbed wire. In July 1913 he drove from his home in Minneapolis to New York City, where he had a seat on the New York Stock Exchange. He died in his sleep in Cody, Wyoming in 1913. After his death his home was completed and was the first to have air conditioning installed.

External links

References

1876 births
1913 deaths
Businesspeople from Minneapolis
Cooling technology
19th-century American businesspeople